Olga Anatolyevna Konon (born 11 November 1989) is a badminton player from Germany, and is of Belarusian origin.

Career 
Konon is known for her speed and attacking style of play. She is currently coached by Kim Ji Hyun and Per Henrik Croona. Konon won her first major international tournament in 2004, at the Finnish International in the mixed event. She was only 14 at the time.

In 2005, she traveled to the north east of England to take on then county champions, mixed doubles team Andrew Dodds and Cheryl Wigham. Konon and her partner were beaten 21–9, 21–14.

In her next match she suffered a knee ligament injury at the Swedish International. After this injury, in 2007, she won a gold medal in girls' doubles and a bronze medal in girls' singles at the European Junior Championships. The following year she won Le Volant d'Or de Toulouse in women's singles, and qualified for the 2008 Summer Olympics.

In October 2014, the UK launched the National Badminton League. This consists of six national teams that play each other once during the season. Top national and European players were 'auctioned' off and bought by one of the six franchises, and Konon was picked to play for the University of Nottingham.  In November 2014, she won her first match for the UON, beating Liz Cann 3–0.

Summer Olympics 
At the 2008 Summer Olympics in Beijing, Konon lost in the round of sixteen to top seeded Xie Xinfang (who later won the silver medal) 21–16, 21–15. En route to the round of sixteen, she defeated Singapore's Xing Aiying, who is ranked 23 in the world, 21–19, 21–12. Later in the round of 32, she beat Slovenia's Maja Tvrdy, 21–17, 21–14.

Achievements

European Junior Championships 
Girls' singles

Girls' doubles

BWF World Tour 
The BWF World Tour, which was announced on 19 March 2017 and implemented in 2018, is a series of elite badminton tournaments sanctioned by the Badminton World Federation (BWF). The BWF World Tours are divided into levels of World Tour Finals, Super 1000, Super 750, Super 500, Super 300 (part of the HSBC World Tour), and the BWF Tour Super 100.

Mixed doubles

BWF International Challenge/Series/European Circuit 
Women's singles

Women's doubles

Mixed doubles

  BWF International Challenge tournament
  BWF International Series/ European Circuit tournament

References

External links 
 
 

1989 births
Living people
Sportspeople from Brest, Belarus
Naturalized citizens of Poland
Naturalized citizens of Germany
Belarusian female badminton players
Badminton players at the 2008 Summer Olympics
Olympic badminton players of Belarus
Polish female badminton players
German female badminton players